Stojmenović is a Serbian surname derived from the South Slavic masculine name Stoimen. It may refer to:

Dragan Stojmenović, author
Ivan Stojmenović (born 1957), Serbian-Canadian mathematician and computer scientist
Nebojša Stojmenović, Serbian footballer
Nikola Stojmenović, swimmer

Geographical distribution
As of 2022, majority of all known bearers of the surname Stojmenović were residents of Pčinja District, particularly Vranje and Bosilegrad, followed by Belgrade, South Banat District (Karavukovo) and Leskovac.

See also
Stojanović, a surname
Stojković, a surname
Stojačić, a surname

References

Serbian surnames